Foulsham was a railway station in North Norfolk. It served the village of Foulsham, and was closed to passengers on 15 September 1952. The line from Foulsham to Reepham closed to goods at the same date.  Goods traffic on the section between Foulsham and County School continued until 31 October 1964.

Signal boxes

See also
 List of closed railway stations in Norfolk

References

External links
 Archive photos of Foulsham station

Disused railway stations in Norfolk
Former Great Eastern Railway stations
Railway stations in Great Britain opened in 1882
Railway stations in Great Britain closed in 1952